Gymnoscopelus piabilis, the Southern blacktip lanternfish is a species of lanternfish found circumglobally in the Southern Hemisphere between about 46° and 52°S, at depths below  at night.  This species grows to a length of  SL. It is a mesopelagic-benthopelagic species.

Bibliography
 

Myctophidae
Fish described in 1931
Taxa named by Gilbert Percy Whitley